"Alternative City", the Stockholm branch of Friends of the Earth. Founded in 1969 as a movement against urban renewal in the Stockholm city center, organized a successful battle against police to save a popular outdoor café, "the Battle of the Elms" in 1971 which took out most of the vigour from the renewal project. Organized some of the first Reclaim the streets (1970) and Critical mass (1971, 1991) actions. Has campaigned against motorways since then, but did also sponsor EYFA (1984), A SEED (1990), 50 Years Is Enough (1992) and the EuroMarch Against Unemployment (1997) as well as domestic campaigns against privatizations and for the welfare state (late 1990s, early 2000s).

Alternativ Stad was always a troublesome member of the environmental movement since it never highlighted medical or chemical issues or arguments, but always social and cultural, considering itself to be rather a defender of the commons rather than the environment.

References

Sources
Stahre, Ulf (1999): Den alternativa staden, Stockholmia, 
Stahre, Ulf (2007): Den globala staden, Atlas,

External links
Official homepage

Environmental organizations based in Sweden
Organizations established in 1969
1969 establishments in Sweden